Judith Ann Yannello (born 1943) is a former judge of the Armed Services Board of Contract Appeals and the United States Court of Federal Claims from 1982 to 1987.

Born in Buffalo, New York, Yannello received a Bachelor of Arts from Barnard College in 1964, followed by a J.D. from Cornell Law School in 1967. She was a law clerk on the U.S. Court of Claims from 1967 to 1968, and then a trial attorney in the Civil Division of the U.S. Department of Justice from 1968 to 1973, when she entered private practice in Washington, D.C.

In 1976, Yannello became an administrative judge on the Armed Services Board of Contract Appeals, and in 1977, she became a trial judge of the U.S. Court of Claims. On October 1, 1982, she was reassigned by operation of law under the Federal Courts Improvement Act to the newly created U.S. Claims Court. She resigned from the Claims Court on May 31, 1987, and returned to the Armed Services Board of Contract Appeals, where she continued to serve until 1996.

References

External links 

1943 births
Living people
Judges of the United States Court of Federal Claims
United States Article I federal judges appointed by Jimmy Carter
Lawyers from Buffalo, New York
Barnard College alumni
Cornell Law School alumni
20th-century American judges